Pokrovskoye is a rural locality in Artyukhovsky Selsoviet Rural Settlement, Oktyabrsky District, Kursk Oblast, Russia. Population:

Geography 
The village is located on the Dichnya River (a left tributary of the Seym River), 58 km from the Russia–Ukraine border, 30 km south-west of Kursk, 13 km south-west of the district center – the urban-type settlement Pryamitsyno, at the northern border of the selsoviet center – Artyukhovka.

 Climate
Pokrovskoye has a warm-summer humid continental climate (Dfb in the Köppen climate classification).

Transport 
Pokrovskoye is located 21 km from the federal route  Crimea Highway (a part of the European route ), on the road of regional importance  ("Crimea Highway" – Ivanino, part of the European route ), on the road of intermunicipal significance  (38K-010 – Verkhnyaya Malykhina), 8 km from the nearest railway halt 433 km (railway line Lgov I — Kursk).

The rural locality is situated 41 km from Kursk Vostochny Airport, 117 km from Belgorod International Airport and 241 km from Voronezh Peter the Great Airport.

References

Notes

Sources

Rural localities in Oktyabrsky District, Kursk Oblast